Cotton Incorporated is a non-profit organization funded by cotton growers in the United States through per-bale assessments on producers and importers levied by the Cotton Board, which reports to the United States Department of Agriculture.

The Cotton Research and Promotion Act of 1966 enabled the establishment of Cotton Incorporated in 1970. The organization conducts research and promotes the use of cotton, including initial processing, recycling, and marketing. The company has helped cotton increase market share in fabrics since it was enacted, both through the branding of cotton with the "Seal of Cotton" and improved technology. The successful campaign was the first commodity brand.

Cotton Incorporated's world headquarters are located in Cary, North Carolina, and offices are located in New York, Mexico City, Hong Kong, Shanghai, and Osaka. Cotton Incorporated works with the Cotton Council International.

On Thanksgiving Day, 1989, Cotton Incorporated launched its long-running "Fabric of Our Lives" advertising campaign.

References

 Making cotton 'the fabric of our lives'.  Marketplace.  November 15, 2010.

External links 
 

Agricultural marketing organizations
Organizations established in 1970
Organizations based in Cary, North Carolina
1970 establishments in the United States
Cotton industry in the United States
Cotton organizations